Henry W. Hupfauf (August 11, 1885 – October 6, 1946) was an American farmer, businessman, and politician.

Hupfauf was born in the town of Harrison, Calumet County, Wisconsin. He was a farmer and worked for the Menominee River Sugar Company. He operated a tavern and general store in Darboy, Wisconsin and was involved with the dairy and telephone cooperatives. He served as town clerk and school clerk of the school district. In 1937, Hupfauf served in the Wisconsin State Assembly and was a Democrat.

Notes

1885 births
1946 deaths
People from Harrison, Calumet County, Wisconsin
Businesspeople from Wisconsin
Farmers from Wisconsin
School board members in Wisconsin
20th-century American politicians
20th-century American businesspeople
Democratic Party members of the Wisconsin State Assembly